Doloessa constellata is a species of snout moth in the genus Doloessa. It was described by George Hampson in 1898 and is known from Assam, India.

References

Moths described in 1898
Tirathabini